Association for Protection of Civil Rights is a non-governmental organization which was established in 2006 for the protection of human rights of the exploited-deprived sections of the society. It is composed of advocate, social activities and grassroots paralegal social workers.

The association is currently working in seventeen states

Object 

 A plan to educate and inform the public about their civil rights.
 A help line to counsel and advise the deprived and the downtrodden.
 A training programme for social activities.
 An effort to protest and safeguard the legal rights of oppressed.
 A scheme to provide legal defense to the victims of injustice.
 A programme to eradicate oppression and injustice from the Indian scene.

References 

Human rights organisations based in India
2006 establishments in Delhi